The Source Presents:  Hip Hop Hits, Volume 2 is the second annual music compilation album to be contributed by The Source magazine.  Released November 10, 1998 and distributed by Polygram Records, Hip Hop Hits Volume 2 features eighteen hip hop and rap hits.  It went to number 29 on the Top R&B/Hip Hop Albums chart and peaked at number 46 on the Billboard 200 album chart.

While the album is the first Hip Hop Hits volume not to feature an R&B/Hip Hop or a pop hit in the number-one position, four tracks on the album had reached number-one on the Billboard Hot Rap Tracks chart:  "Deja Vu (Uptown Baby)," "I Got the Hook Up," ""Money, Power, Respect" and "Turn It Up (Remix)/Fire It Up."

Track listing
Still Not a Player - Big Punisher Featuring Joe
Money Ain't a Thang - Jermaine Dupri Featuring Jay-Z
Money, Power & Respect - The LOX Featuring DMX, Lil' Kim
Deja Vu (Uptown Baby) - Lord Tariq and Peter Gunz
Do for Love - 2Pac
Hope I Don't Go Back - E-40
Party Ain't a Party - Queen Pen
Turn It Up - Busta Rhymes
Get at Me Dog - DMX Featuring Sheek Louch
Still a G Thang - Snoop Dogg
It's Alright - Jay-Z Featuring Memphis Bleek
What'cha Gonna Do? - Jayo Felony Featuring Method Man, DMX
Horse & Carriage - Cam'ron Featuring Ma$e
N.O.R.E. - Noreaga
I Got the Hook-Up! - Master P and Sons of Funk
Luv 2 Luv U [Remix] - Timbaland & Magoo
4, 3, 2, 1 - LL Cool J Featuring Canibus, DMX, Method Man, Redman
Gone Till November - Wyclef Jean

Charts

Weekly charts

Year-end charts

References

Hip hop compilation albums
1998 compilation albums